Jonathan Scott may refer to:

Jonathan Scott (orientalist) (1754–1829), English linguist and translator
Jonathan Scott (zoologist) (born 1949), wildlife photographer, zoologist and host of BBC's Big Cat Diary
Jonathan Scott (politician) (born 1966), Rhode Island Republican politician, who ran for US Congress in 2006
Jonathan Scott (television personality) (born 1978), Canadian television personality
Jonathan Scott (actor), British actor
Jonathan Scott (American football) (born 1983), American football offensive tackle
Jon Scott (born 1958), American news anchor

See also
John Scott (disambiguation)